Targeted advertising is a form of advertising, including online advertising, that is directed towards an audience with certain traits, based on the product or person the advertiser is promoting. These traits can either be demographic with a focus on race, economic status, sex, age, generation, level of education, income level, and employment, or psychographic focused on the consumer values, personality, attitude, opinion, lifestyle and interest. This focus can also entail behavioral variables, such as browser history, purchase history, and other recent online activities. The process of algorithm targeting eliminates waste. 

Traditional forms of advertising, including billboards, newspapers, magazines, and radio channels, are progressively becoming replaced by online advertisements. The Information and communication technology (ICT) space has transformed recently, resulting in targeted advertising stretching across all ICT technologies, such as web, IPTV, and mobile environments. In the next generation's advertising, the importance of targeted advertisements will radically increase, as it spreads across numerous ICT channels cohesively.

Through the emergence of new online channels, the usefulness of targeted advertising is increasing because companies aim to minimize wasted advertising by means of information technology. Most targeted new media advertising currently uses second-order proxies for targets, such as tracking online or mobile web activities of consumers, associating historical web page consumer demographics with new consumer web page access, using a search word as the basis of implied interest, or contextual advertising.

Types 
Web services are continually generating new business ventures and revenue opportunities for internet corporations. Companies have rapidly developed technological capabilities that allow them to gather information about web users. By tracking and monitoring what websites users visit, internet service providers can directly show ads that are relative to the consumer's preferences. Most of today's websites are using these targeting technologies to track users' internet behavior and there is much debate over the privacy issues present.

Search engine marketing

Search engine marketing uses search engines to reach target audiences. For example, Google's Remarketing Campaigns are a type of targeted marketing where advertisers use the IP addresses of computers that have visited their websites to remarket their ad specifically to users who have previously been on their website whilst they browse websites that are a part of the Google display network, or when searching for keywords related to a product or service on the Google search engine. Dynamic remarketing can improve the targeted advertising as the ads are able to include the products or services that the consumers have previously viewed on the advertisers' website within the ads.

Google Ads includes different platforms. The Search Network displays the ads on 'Google Search, other Google sites such as Maps and Shopping, and hundreds of non-Google search partner websites that show ads matched to search results'. 'The Display Network includes a collection of Google websites (like Google Finance, Gmail, Blogger, and YouTube), partner sites, and mobile sites and apps that show adverts from Google Ads matched to the content on a given page.' These two kinds of advertising networks can be beneficial for each specific goal of the company, or type of company. For example, the search network can benefit a company with the goal of reaching consumers actively searching for a particular product or service.

Other ways advertising campaigns are able to target the user is to use browser history and search history. For example, if the user types promotional pens into a search engine such as Google, ads for promotional pens will appear at the top of the page above the organic listings. These ads will be geo-targeted to the area of the user's IP address, showing the product or service in the local area or surrounding regions. The higher ad position is often rewarded to the ad having a higher quality score. The ad quality is affected by the 5 components of the quality score:
 The ad's expected click-through rate
 The quality of the landing page
 The ad/search relevance
 Geographic performance
 The targeted devices

When ranked based on these criteria, it will affect the advertiser by improving ad auction eligibility, the actual cost per click (CPC), ad position, and ad position bid estimates; to summarise, the better the quality score, the better ad position, and lower costs.

Google uses its display network to track what users are looking at and to gather information about them. When a user goes to a website that uses the Google display network, it will send a cookie to Google, showing information on the user, what he or she searched, where they are from, found by the IP address, and then builds a profile around them, allowing Google to easily target ads to the user more specifically. For example, if a user went onto promotional companies' websites often, that sell promotional pens, Google will gather data from the user such as age, gender, location, and other demographic information as well as information on the websites visited, the user will then be put into a category of promotional products, allowing Google to easily display ads on websites the user visits relating to promotional products. these types of adverts are also called behavioral advertisements as they track the website behavior of the user and display ads based on previous pages or searched terms. ("Examples Of Targeted Advertising")

Social media targeting

Social media targeting is a form of targeted advertising, that uses general targeting attributes such as geotargeting, behavioral targeting, socio-psychographic targeting, and gathers the information that consumers have provided on each social media platform. According to the media users' view history, customers who are interested in the criteria will be automatically targeted by the advertisements of certain products or service. For example, Facebook collects massive amounts of user data from surveillance infrastructure on its platforms. Information such as a user's likes, view history, and geographic location is leveraged to micro-target consumers with personalized products. Social media also creates profiles of the consumer and only needs to look at one place, the user's profile, to find all interests and 'likes'.

E.g. Facebook lets advertisers target using broad characteristics like gender, age, and location. Furthermore, they allow more narrow targeting based on demographics, behavior, and interests (see a comprehensive list of Facebook's different types of targeting options).

Television
Advertisements can be targeted to specific consumers watching digital cable or over-the-top video. Targeting can be done according to age, gender, location, or personal interests in films, etc. Cable box addresses can be cross-referenced with information from data brokers like Acxiom, Equifax, and Experian, including information about marriage, education, criminal record, and credit history. Political campaigns may also match against public records such as party affiliation and which elections and party primaries the view has voted in.

Mobile devices
Since the early 2000s, advertising has been pervasive online and more recently in the mobile setting. Targeted advertising based on mobile devices allows more information about the consumer to be transmitted, not just their interests, but their information about their location and time. This allows advertisers to produce advertisements that could cater to their schedule and a more specific changing environment.

Content and contextual targeting

The most straightforward method of targeting is content/contextual targeting. This is when advertisers put ads in a specific place, based on the relative content present. Another name used is content-oriented advertising, as it is corresponding to the context being consumed. This targeting method can be used across different mediums, for example in an article online, purchasing homes would have an advert associated with this context, like an insurance ad. This is usually achieved through an ad matching system that analyses the contents on a page or finds keywords and presents a relevant advert, sometimes through pop-ups. Though sometimes the ad matching system can fail, as it can neglect to tell the difference between positive and negative correlations. This can result in placing contradictory adverts, which are not appropriate to the content.

Technical targeting
Technical targeting is associated with the user's own software or hardware status. The advertisement is altered depending on the user's available network bandwidth, for example, if a user is on their mobile phone that has limited connection, the ad delivery system will display a version of the ad that is smaller for a faster data transfer rate.

Addressable advertising systems serve ads directly based on demographic, psychographic, or behavioral attributes associated with the consumer(s) exposed to the ad. These systems are always digital and must be addressable in that the endpoint which serves the ad (set-top box, website, or digital sign) must be capable of rendering an ad independently of any other endpoints based on consumer attributes specific to that endpoint at the time the ad is served. Addressable advertising systems, therefore, must use consumer traits associated with the endpoints as the basis for selecting and serving ads.

Time targeting

According to the Journal of Marketing, more than 1.8 billion clients spent a minimum of 118 minutes daily- via web-based networking media in 2016. Nearly 77% of these clients interact with the content through likes, commenting, and clicking on links related to content. With this astounding buyer trend, it is important for advertisers to choose the right time to schedule content, in order to maximize advertising efficiency.

To determine what time of day is most effective for scheduling content, it is essential to know when the brain is most effective at retaining memory. Research in chronopsychology has credited that time-of-day impacts diurnal variety in a person's working memory accessibility and has discovered the enactment of inhibitory procedures to build working memory effectiveness during times of low working memory accessibility. Working memory is known to be vital for language perception, learning, and reasoning providing us with the capacities of putting away, recovering, and preparing quick data.
For many people, working memory accessibility is good when they get up toward the beginning of the day, most reduced in mid-evening, and moderate at night.

Sociodemographic targeting
Sociodemographic targeting focuses on the characteristics of consumers. This includes their age, generation, gender, salary, and nationality. The idea is to target users specifically and to use this collected data, for example, targeting a male in the age bracket of 18–24. Facebook and other social media platforms uses this form of targeting by showing advertisements relevant to the user's individual demographic on their account, this can show up in forms of banner ads, mobile ads, or commercial videos.

Geographical and location-based targeting
This type of advertising involves targeting different users based on their geographic location. IP addresses can signal the location of a user and can usually transfer the location through ZIP codes. Locations are then stored for users in static profiles, thus advertisers can easily target these individuals based on their geographic location. A location-based service (LBS) is a mobile information service that allows spatial and temporal data transmission and can be used to an advertiser's advantage. This data can be harnessed from applications on the device (mobile apps like uber) that allow access to the location information. This type of targeted advertising focuses on localizing content, for example, a user could be prompted with options of activities in the area, for example, places to eat, nearby shops, etc. Although producing advertising off consumer's location-based services can improve the effectiveness of delivering ads, it can raise issues with the user's privacy.

Behavioral targeting
Behavioral targeting is centered around the activity/actions of users, and is more easily achieved on web pages. Information from browsing websites can be collected from data mining, which finds patterns in users' search history. Advertisers using this method believe it produces ads that will be more relevant to users, thus leading consumers to be more likely influenced by them. If a consumer was frequently searching for plane ticket prices, the targeting system would recognize this and start showing related adverts across unrelated websites, such as airfare deals on Facebook. Its advantage is that it can target individual's interests, rather than target groups of people whose interests may vary.

When a consumer visits a web site, the pages they visit, the amount of time they view each page, the links they click on, the searches they make, and the things that they interact with, allow sites to collect that data, and other factors, to create a 'profile' that links to that visitor's web browser. As a result, site publishers can use this data to create defined audience segments based upon visitors that have similar profiles.

When visitors return to a specific site or a network of sites using the same web browser, those profiles can be used to allow marketers and advertisers to position their online ads and messaging in front of those visitors who exhibit a greater level of interest and intent for the products and services being offered. Behavioral targeting has emerged as one of the main technologies used to increase the efficiency and profits of digital marketing and advertisements, as media providers are able to provide individual users with highly relevant advertisements. On the theory that properly targeted ads and messaging will fetch more consumer interest, publishers can charge a premium for behaviorally targeted ads and marketers can achieve

Behavioral marketing can be used on its own or in conjunction with other forms of targeting. Many practitioners also refer to this process as "audience targeting".

Major advantages of Behavioral marketing are that it will help in reaching surfers with affinity, reach surfers that were not exposed to a media campaign, contact surfers close to conversion and in reconnecting with prospects or customers.

Onsite

Behavioral targeting may also be applied to any online property on the premise that it either improves the visitor experience or benefits the online property, typically through increased conversion rates or increased spending levels. The early adopters of this technology/philosophy were editorial sites such as HotWired, online advertising with leading online ad servers, retail or another e-commerce website as a technique for increasing the relevance of product offers and promotions on a visitor by visitor basis. More recently, companies outside this traditional e-commerce marketplace have started to experiment with these emerging technologies.

The typical approach to this starts by using web analytics or behavioral analytics to break-down the range of all visitors into a number of discrete channels. Each channel is then analyzed and a virtual profile is created to deal with each channel. These profiles can be based around Personas that give the website operators a starting point in terms of deciding what content, navigation and layout to show to each of the different personas. When it comes to the practical problem of successfully delivering the profiles correctly this is usually achieved by either using a specialist content behavioral platform or by bespoke software development. Most platforms identify visitors by assigning a unique ID cookie to each and every visitor to the site thereby allowing them to be tracked throughout their web journey, the platform then makes a rules-based decision about what content to serve.

Self-learning onsite behavioral targeting systems will monitor visitor response to site content and learn what is most likely to generate a desired conversion event. Some good content for each behavioral trait or pattern is often established using numerous simultaneous multivariate tests. Onsite behavioral targeting requires a relatively high level of traffic before statistical confidence levels can be reached regarding the probability of a particular offer generating a conversion from a user with a set behavioral profile. Some providers have been able to do so by leveraging their large user base, such as Yahoo!. Some providers use a rules-based approach, allowing administrators to set the content and offers shown to those with particular traits.

According to research behavioral targeting provides little benefit at a huge privacy cost — when targeting for gender, the targeted guess is 42% accurate, which is less than a random guess. When targeting for gender and age the accuracy is 24%.

Network
Advertising networks use behavioral targeting in a different way than individual sites. Since they serve many advertisements across many different sites, they are able to build up a picture of the likely demographic makeup of internet users.
Data from a visit to one website can be sent to many different companies, including Microsoft and Google subsidiaries, Facebook, Yahoo, many traffic-logging sites, and smaller ad firms.
This data can sometimes be sent to more than 100 websites, and shared with business partners, advertisers, and other third parties for business purposes. The data is collected using cookies, web beacons and similar technologies, and/or a third-party ad serving software, to automatically collect information about site users and site activity. Some servers even record the page that referred you to them, websites you visit after them, which ads you see and which ads you click on.

Online advertising uses cookies, a tool used specifically to identify users, as a means of delivering targeted advertising by monitoring the actions of a user on the website. For this purpose, the cookies used are called tracking cookies. An ad network company such as Google uses cookies to deliver advertisements adjusted to the interests of the user, control the number of times that the user sees an ad and "measure" whether they are advertising the specific product to the customer's preferences.

This data is collected without attaching the people's names, address, email address or telephone number, but it may include device identifying information such as the IP address, MAC address, cookie or other device-specific unique alphanumerical ID of your computer, but some stores may create guest IDs to go along with the data. Cookies are used to control displayed ads and to track browsing activity and usage patterns on sites. This data is used by companies to infer people's age, gender, and possible purchase interests so that they could make customized ads that you would be more likely to click on.

An example would be a user seen on football sites, business sites, and male fashion sites. A reasonable guess would be to assume the user is male. Demographic analyses of individual sites provided either internally (user surveys) or externally (Comscore \ Netratings) allow the networks to sell audiences rather than sites.
Although advertising networks were used to sell this product, this was based on picking the sites where the audiences were. Behavioral targeting allows them to be slightly more specific about this.

Research
In the work titled An Economic Analysis of Online Advertising Using Behavioral Targeting, Chen and Stallaert (2014) study the economic implications when an online publisher engages in behavioral targeting. They consider that the publisher auctions off an advertising slot and are paid on a cost-per-click basis. Chen and Stallaert (2014) identify the factors that affect the publisher's revenue, the advertisers' payoffs, and social welfare. They show that revenue for the online publisher in some circumstances can double when behavioral targeting is used.

Increased revenue for the publisher is not guaranteed: in some cases, the prices of advertising and hence the publisher's revenue can be lower, depending on the degree of competition and the advertisers' valuations. They identify two effects associated with behavioral targeting: a competitive effect and a propensity effect. The relative strength of the two effects determines whether the publisher's revenue is positively or negatively affected. Chen and Stallaert (2014) also demonstrate that, although social welfare is increased and small advertisers are better off under behavioral targeting, the dominant advertiser might be worse off and reluctant to switch from traditional advertising.

In 2006, BlueLithium (now Yahoo! Advertising) in a large online study, examined the effects of behavior targeted advertisements based on contextual content. The study used 400 million "impressions", or advertisements conveyed across behavioral and contextual borders. Specifically, nine behavioral categories (such as "shoppers" or "travelers")with over 10 million "impressions" were observed for patterns across the content.

All measures for the study were taken in terms of click-through rates (CTR) and "action-through rates" (ATR), or conversions. So, for every impression that someone gets, the number of times they "click-through" to it will contribute to CTR data, and every time they go through with or convert on the advertisement the user adds "action-through" data. Results from the study show that advertisers looking for traffic on their advertisements should focus on behavioral targeting in context. Likewise, if they are looking for conversions on the advertisements, behavioral targeting out of context is the most effective process. The data was helpful in determining an "across-the-board rule of thumb"; however, results fluctuated widely by content categories. Overall results from the researchers indicate that the effectiveness of behavioral targeting is dependent on the goals of the advertiser and the primary target market the advertiser is trying to reach.

Privacy and security concerns

Many online users and advocacy groups are concerned about privacy issues around this type of targeting since targeted advertising requires aggregation of large amounts of personal data, including highly sensitive one (such as sexual orientation or sexual preferences, health issues, location) which is then traded between hundreds of parties in the process of real-time bidding.

Obscure to a great many people, individual data are exchanged without the consent of the proprietors. Essentially, it is an obtrusive rupture of protection to profit from the unregulated exchange of individual data. However simultaneously, individual data, particularly the ones that are identified with intrigue and propensity, are a basic segment for conveying web-based promoting, which is the help of numerous sites.

This is a controversy that the behavioral targeting industry is trying to contain through education, advocacy and product constraints in order to keep all information non-personally identifiable or to obtain permission from end-users. AOL created animated cartoons in 2008 to explain to its users that their past actions may determine the content of ads they see in the future. Canadian academics at the University of Ottawa Canadian Internet Policy and Public Interest Clinic have recently demanded the federal privacy commissioner to investigate online profiling of Internet users for targeted advertising.

The European Commission (via commissioner Meglena Kuneva) has also raised a number of concerns related to online data collection (of personal data), profiling and behavioral targeting, and is looking for "enforcing existing regulation".

In October 2009 it was reported that a recent survey carried out by University of Pennsylvania and the Berkeley Center for Law and Technology found that a large majority of US internet users rejected the use of behavioral advertising.
Several research efforts by academics and others have demonstrated that data that is supposedly anonymized can be used to identify real individuals.

In December 2010, online tracking firm Quantcast agreed to pay $2.4M to settle a class-action lawsuit for their use of 'zombie' cookies to track consumers. These zombie cookies, which were on partner sites such as MTV, Hulu, and ESPN, would re-generate to continue tracking the user even if they were deleted. Other uses of such technology include Facebook, and their use of the Facebook Beacon to track users across the internet, to later use for more targeted advertising. Tracking mechanisms without consumer consent are generally frowned upon; however, tracking of consumer behavior online or on mobile devices are key to digital advertising, which is the financial backbone to most of the internet.

In March 2011, it was reported that the online ad industry would begin working with the Council of Better Business Bureaus to start policing itself as part of its program to monitor and regulate how marketers track consumers online, also known as behavioral advertising.

Retargeting

Retargeting is where advertisers use behavioral targeting to produce ads that follow users after users have looked at or purchased a particular item. An example of this is store catalogs, where stores subscribe customers to their email system after a purchase hoping that they draw attention to more items for continuous purchases. The main example of retargeting that has earned a reputation from most people is ads that follow users across the web, showing them the same items that they have looked at in the hope that they will purchase them. Retargeting is a very effective process; by analysing consumers activities with the brand they can address their consumers' behavior appropriately.

Process
Advertising provides advertisers with a direct line of communication to existing and prospective consumers. By using a combination of words and/or pictures the general aim of the advertisement is to act as a "medium of information" (David Ogilvy) making the means of delivery and to whom the information is delivered most important. Advertising should define how and when structural elements of advertisements influence receivers, knowing that all receivers are not the same and thus may not respond in a single, similar manner. Targeted advertising serves the purpose of placing particular advertisements before specific groups so as to reach consumers who would be interested in the information. Advertisers aim to reach consumers as efficiently as possible with the belief that it will result in a more effective campaign. By targeting, advertisers are able to identify when and where the ad should be positioned in order to achieve maximum profits. This requires an understanding of how customers' minds work (see also neuromarketing) so as to determine the best channel by which to communicate.

Types of targeting include, but are not limited to advertising based on demographics, psychographics, behavioral variables and contextual targeting.

Behavioral advertising is the most common form of targeting used online. Internet cookies are sent back and forth between an internet server and the browser, that allows a user to be identified or to track their progressions. Cookies provide detail on what pages a consumer visits, the amount of time spent viewing each page, the links clicked on; and searches and interactions made. From this information, the cookie issuer gathers an understanding of the user's browsing tendencies and interests generating a profile. Analyzing the profile, advertisers are able to create defined audience segments based upon users with similar returned similar information, hence profiles. Tailored advertising is then placed in front of the consumer based upon what organizations working on behalf of the advertisers assume are the interests of the consumer. These advertisements have been formatted so as to appear on pages and in front of users that it would most likely appeal to based on their profiles. For example, under behavioral targeting, if a user is known to have recently visited a number of automotive shopping and comparison sites based on the data recorded by cookies stored on the user's computer, the user can then be served automotive-related advertisements when visiting other sites. Behavioral advertising is reliant on data both wittingly and unwittingly provided by users and is made up of two different forms: one involving the delivery of advertising based on assessment of user's web movements; the second involving the examination of communication and information as it passes through the gateways of internet service providers.

Demographic targeting was the first and most basic form of targeting used online. involves segmenting an audience into more specific groups using parameters such as gender, age, ethnicity, annual income, parental status etc. All members of the group share a common trait. So, when an advertiser wishes to run a campaign aimed at a specific group of people then that campaign is intended only for the group that contains those traits at which the campaign is targeted. Having finalized the advertiser's demographic target, a website or a website section is chosen as a medium because a large proportion of the targeted audience utilizes that form of media.

Segmentation using psychographics Is based on an individual's personality, values, interests and lifestyles. A recent study concerning what forms of media people use- conducted by the Entertainment Technology Center at the University of Southern California, the Hallmark Channel, and E-Poll Market Research- concludes that a better predictor of media usage is the user's lifestyle. Researchers concluded that while cohorts of these groups may have similar demographic profiles, they may have different attitudes and media usage habits. Psychographics can provide further insight by distinguishing an audience into specific groups by using their personal traits. Once acknowledging this is the case, advertisers can begin to target customers having recognized that factors other than age for example provides greater insight into the customer.

Contextual advertising is a strategy to place advertisements on media vehicles, such as specific websites or print magazines, whose themes are relevant to the promoted products. Advertisers apply this strategy in order to narrow-target their audiences. Advertisements are selected and served by automated systems based on the identity of the user and the displayed content of the media. The advertisements will be displayed across the user's different platforms and are chosen based on searches for keywords; appearing as either a web page or pop up ads. It is a form of targeted advertising in which the content of an ad is in direct correlation to the content of the webpage the user is viewing.

The major psychographic segments

Personality

Every brand, service or product has itself a personality, how it is viewed by the public and the community and marketers will create these personalities to match the personality traits of their target market. Marketers and advertisers create these personalities because when a consumer can relate to the characteristics of a brand, service or product they are more likely to feel connected towards the product and purchase it.

Lifestyle

Advertisers are aware that different people lead different lives, have different lifestyles and different wants and needs at different times in their consumer's lives, thus individual differences can be compensated for Advertisers who base their segmentation on psychographic characteristics promote their product as the solution to these wants and needs. Segmentation by lifestyle considers where the consumer is in their life cycle and which preferences are associated with that life stage.

Opinions, attitudes, interests and hobbies

Psychographic segmentation also includes opinions on religion, gender and politics, sporting and recreational activities, views on the environment and arts and cultural issues. The views that the market segments hold and the activities they participate in will have an impact on the products and services they purchase and it will affect how they respond to the message.

Alternatives to behavioral advertising and psychographic targeting include geographic targeting and demographic targeting

When advertisers want to efficiently reach as many consumers as possible, they use a six-step process.

identify the objectives the advertisers do this by setting benchmarks, identifying products or proposals, identifying the core values and strategic objectives. This step also includes listing and monitoring competitors content and creating objectives for the next 12-18months.
The second step understanding buyers, is all about identifying what types of buyers the advertiser wants to target and identifying the buying process for the consumers.
Identifying gaps is key as this illustrates all of the gaps in the content and finds what is important for the buying process and the stages of the content.
content is created and the stage where the key messages are identified and the quality bench line is discussed.
Organizing distribution is key for maximizing the potential of the content, these can be social media, blogs or google display networks.
The last step is vital for an advertiser as they need to measure the return on investment (ROI) there are multiple ways to measure performance, these can be tracking web traffic, sales lead quality, and/ or social media sharing.

Alternatives to behavioral advertising include audience targeting, contextual targeting, and psychographic targeting.

Effectiveness

Targeting aims to improve the effectiveness of advertising and reduce the wastage created by sending advertising to consumers who are unlikely to purchase that product. Targeted advertising or improved targeting may lead to lower advertising costs and expenditures.

The effects of advertising on society and those targeted are all implicitly underpinned by consideration of whether advertising compromises autonomous choice.

Those arguing for the ethical acceptability of advertising claim either that, because of the commercially competitive context of advertising, the consumer has a choice over what to accept and what to reject.

Humans have the cognitive competence and are equipped with the necessary faculties to decide whether to be affected by adverts. Those arguing against note, for example, that advertising can make us buy things we do not want or that, as advertising is enmeshed in a capitalist system, it only presents choices based on consumerist-centered reality thus limiting the exposure to non-materialist lifestyles.

Although the effects of target advertising are mainly focused on those targeted it also has an effect on those not targeted. Its unintended audiences often view an advertisement targeted at other groups and start forming judgments and decisions regarding the advertisement and even the brand and company behind the advertisement, these judgments may affect future consumer behavior.

The Network Advertising Initiative conducted a study in 2009 measuring the pricing and effectiveness of targeted advertising. It revealed that targeted advertising:
Secured an average of 2.7 times as much revenue per ad as non-targeted "run of network" advertising.
Twice as effective at converting users who click on the ads into buyers

However, other studies show that targeted advertising, at least by gender, is not effective.

One of the major difficulties in measuring the economic efficiency of targeting, however, is being able to observe what would have happened in the absence of targeting since the users targeted by advertisers are more likely to convert than the general population. Farahat and Bailey  exploit a large-scale natural experiment on Yahoo! allowing them to measure the true economic impact of targeted advertising on brand searches and clicks. They find, assuming the cost per 1000 ad impressions (CPM) is $1, that:
The marginal cost of a brand-related search resulting from ads is $15.65 per search, but is only $1.69 per search from a targeted campaign. 
The marginal cost of a click is 72 cents, but only 16 cents from a targeted campaign. 
The variation in CTR lifts from targeted advertising campaigns is mostly determined by pre-existing brand interest.
Research shows that Content marketing in 2015 generates 3 times as many leads as traditional outbound marketing, but costs 62% less showing how being able to advertise to targeted consumers is becoming the ideal way to advertise to the public. As other stats show how 86% of people skip television adverts and 44% of people ignore direct mail, which also displays how advertising to the wrong group of people can be a waste of resources.

Benefits and disadvantages

Benefits
Proponents of targeted advertising argue that there are advantages for both consumers and advertisers:

Consumers
Targeted advertising benefits consumers because advertisers are able to effectively attract consumers by using their purchasing and browsing habits this enables ads to be more apparent and useful for customers. Having ads that are related to the interests of the consumers allow the message to be received in a direct manner through effective touchpoints. An example of how targeted advertising is beneficial to consumers if that if someone sees an ad targeted to them for something similar to an item they have previously viewed online and were interested in, they are more likely to buy it.

Consumers can benefit from targeted advertising in the following ways:

 More effective delivery of desired product or service directly to the consumer: having assumed the traits or interests of the consumer from their targeting, advertisements that will appeal and engage the customer are used.
 More direct delivery of a message that relates to the consumer's interest: advertisements are delivered to the customer in a manner that is comfortable, whether it be jargon or a certain medium, the delivery of the message is part of the consumer's 'lifestyle'

Intelligence agencies 
Intelligence agencies worldwide can more easily, and without exposing their personnel to the risks of HUMINT, track targets at sensitive locations such as military bases or training camps by simply purchasing location data from commercial providers who collect it from mobile devices with geotargeting enabled used by the operatives present at these places.

Advertiser
Advertisers benefit with target advertising are reduced resource costs and creation of more effective ads by attracting consumers with a strong appeal to these products. Targeted advertising allows advertisers in reduced cost of advertisement by minimizing "wasted" advertisements to non-interested consumers. Targeted advertising captivate the attention of consumers they were aimed at resulting in higher return on investment for the company.

Because behavioral advertising enables advertisers to more easily determine user preference and purchasing habit, the ads will be more pertinent and useful for consumers. By creating a more efficient and effective manner of advertising to the consumer, an advertiser benefits greatly and in the following ways:
 More efficient campaign development: by having information about the consumer an advertiser is able to make more concise decisions on how to best communicate with them.
 Better use of advertising dollar: A greater understanding of the targeted audience will allow an advertiser to achieve better results with an advertising campaign
 Increased return on investment: Targeted advertisements will yield higher results for lower costs.

Using information from consumers can benefit the advertiser by developing a more efficient campaign, targeted advertising is proven to work both effectively and efficiently. They don't want to waste time and money advertising to the "wrong people". Through technological advances, the internet has allowed advertisers to target consumers beyond the capabilities of traditional media, and target significantly larger amount. The main advantage of using targeted advertising is how it can help minimize wasted advertising by using detailed information about individuals who are intended for a product. If consumers are produced these ads that are targeted for them, it is more likely they will be interested and click on them. 'Know thy consumer', is a simple principle used by advertisers, when businesses know information about consumers, it can be easier to target them and get them to purchase their product. Some consumers do not mind if their information is used, and are more accepting to ads with easily accessible links. This is because they may appreciate adverts tailored to their preferences, rather than just generic ads. They are more likely to be directed to products they want, and possibly purchase them, in return generating more income for the business advertising.

Disadvantages

Consumers
Targeted advertising raises privacy concerns. Targeted advertising is performed by analyzing consumers' activities through online services such as HTTP cookies and data mining, both of which can be seen as detrimental to consumers' privacy. Marketers research consumers' online activity for targeted advertising campaigns like programmatic and SEO. Consumers' privacy concerns revolve around today's unprecedented tracking capabilities and whether to trust their trackers. Consumers may feel uncomfortable with sites knowing so much about their activity online. Targeted advertising aims to increase promotions' relevance to potential buyers, delivering ad campaign executions to specified consumers at critical stages in the buying decision process. This potentially limits a consumer's awareness of alternatives and reinforces selective exposure. Consumers may start avoiding certain sites and brands if they keep getting served the same advertisements as the consumer may feel like they are being watched too much or may start getting annoyed with certain brands. Due to the increased use of tracking cookies all over the web many sites now have cookie notices that pop up when a visitor lands on a site. The notice informs the visitor about the use of cookies, how they affect the visitor, and the visitor's options in regards to what information the cookies can obtain.

Advertiser
Targeting advertising is not a process performed overnight, it takes time and effort to analyze the behavior of consumers. This results in more expenses than the traditional advertising processes. As targeted advertising is seen more effective this is not always a disadvantage but there are cases where advertisers have not received the profit expected. Targeted advertising has a limited reach to consumers, advertisers are not always aware that consumers change their minds and purchases which will no longer mean ads are apparent to them. Another disadvantage is that while using cookies to track activity advertisers are unable to depict whether 1 or more consumers are using the same computer. This is apparent in family homes where multiple people from a broad age range are using the same device.

Controversies

Targeted advertising has raised controversies, most particularly towards the privacy rights and policies. With behavioral targeting focusing in on specific user actions such as site history, browsing history, and buying behavior, this has raised user concern that all activity is being tracked.

Privacy International is a UK based registered charity that defends and promotes the right to privacy across the world. This organization is fighting in order to make Governments legislate in a way that protects the rights of the general public. According to them, from any ethical standpoint such interception of web traffic must be conditional on the basis of explicit and informed consent. And action must be taken where organizations can be shown to have acted unlawfully.

A survey conducted in the United States by the Pew Internet & American Life Project between January 20 and February 19, 2012, revealed that most of Americans are not in favor of targeted advertising, seeing it as an invasion of privacy. Indeed, 68% of those surveyed said they are "not okay" with targeted advertising because they do not like having their online behavior tracked and analyzed.

Another issue with targeted advertising is the lack of 'new' advertisements of goods or services. Seeing as all ads are tailored to be based on user preferences, no different products will be introduced to the consumer. Hence, in this case the consumer will be at a loss as they are not exposed to anything new.

Advertisers concentrate their resources on the consumer, which can be very effective when done right. When advertising doesn't work, consumer can find this creepy and start wondering how the advertiser learnt the information about them. Consumers can have concerns over ads targeted at them, which are basically too personal for comfort, feeling a need for control over their own data.

In targeted advertising privacy is a complicated issue due to the type of protected user information and the number of parties involved. The three main parties involved in online advertising are the advertiser, the publisher, and the network. People tend to want to keep their previously browsed websites private, although users 'clickstreams' are being transferred to advertisers who work with ad networks. The user's preferences and interests are visible through their clickstream and their behavioral profile is generated.

Many find this form of advertising to be concerning and see these tactics as manipulative and a sense of discrimination. As a result of this, a number of methods have been introduced in order to avoid advertising. Internet users employing ad blockers are rapidly growing in numbers. The average global ad-blocking rate in early 2018 was estimated at 27 percent. Greece is at the top of the list with more than 40% of internet users admit to using ad-blocking software. Among technical population ad-blocking reaches 58%.

See also
 Behavioral retargeting
 Behavioral targeting case law:
 In re DoubleClick
 FTC regulation of behavioral advertising
 Cross-device tracking
 Deradicalization
 Digital self-determination
 Digital traces
 Forensic profiling
 Internet manipulation
 Personalization
 Personalized marketing
 Reality mining
 Surveillance capitalism

References

Further reading

 Ahmad, K., & Begen, A. C. (2009). IPTV and video networks in the 2015 timeframe: The evolution to medianets. Communications Magazine, pp. 68–74. Retrieved from http://ieeexplore.ieee.org/stamp/stamp.jsp?tp=&arnumber=5350371
 "Benefits Of Targeted Advertisements - Increase ROI With Targeted Ads". eReach Consulting. N.p., 2013. Web. 1 Apr. 2016.
 Constantinides, E. (2006). Journal of marketing management, vol 22 issue Â¾ pp.407-438. Enschede, The Netherlands:
 Digital Advertising Alliance (DAA) Self-Regulatory Program | www.aboutads.info. (2016). Aboutads.info. Retrieved 29 March 2016, from http://www.aboutads.info/
 Juels, A. (2011). Targeted advertisingâ€¦ and privacy too. Springer Berlin Heidelberg
 Konow, R., Tan, W., Loyola, L., Pereira, J., Baloian, N. (2010). Recommender system for contextual advertising in IPTV scenarios, pp. 617–622. Retrieved from http://allm.net/wp-content/uploads/2014/10/rd2010_02_CSCWD2010.pdf
 Kotler, P., Burton, S., Brown, L. & Armstrong, G. (2012). Marketing (9th ed.) Australia: Pearson Australia
 McCarthy, E.J. (1964). Basic marketing, a managerial approach. Homewood Richard D. Irwin, Inc

 Star turn. (2000). The Economist. Retrieved 29 March 2016, from http://www.economist.com/node/330628
 Stern, B. J., & Subramaniam, G. K. (2006). Method and system for user to user targeted advertising. U.S. Patent Application No. 11/455,561.
 Suli, J (2017) How To Use Facebook To Get Targeted Traffic 
 "Use Remarketing To Reach Past Website Visitors And App Users - Adwords Help".Support.google.com. N.p., 2016. Web. 1 Apr. 2016.
 Waechter, S. (2010). Contextual advertising in online communication: an investigation of relationships between multiple content types on a webpage. Auckland University of Technology
 

Advertising
Advertising techniques
Online advertising methods
Marketing by target group
Market segmentation
Promotion and marketing communications
Online advertising